Hidden Valley is a 1932 American western film directed by Robert N. Bradbury and starring Bob Steele, Gertrude Messinger and Francis McDonald.

Synopsis
In New Mexico Bob Harding is assisting a professor in search of an ancient civilization, when his companion is shot and killed and the map he is carrying stolen by a gang looking for treasure. Harding is arrested and tried for murder, but manages to escape.

Cast
 Bob Steele as Bob Harding
 Gertrude Messinger as 	Joyce Lanners 
 Francis McDonald as 	Frank Gavin
 Ray Hallor as 	Jimmie Lanners
 John Elliott as Judge
 Arthur Millett as Sheriff Dave Bristow
 V.L. Barnes a s	McCord - Prospector
 George 'Gabby' Hayes as 	Gavin Henchman - Dark Hat 
 Joe De La Cruz as 	Gomez - Gavin Henchman
 Dick Dickinson as 	Gavin Henchman - White Hat
 Earl Dwire as Prosecuting Attorney 
 Jack Evans as 	Deputy on Desert 
 Herman Hack as 	Indian Medicine Man / Posse Rider 
 William McCall as Deputy Bill 
 Artie Ortego as 	Indian Guide

References

Bibliography
 Pitts, Michael R. Western Movies: A Guide to 5,105 Feature Films. McFarland, 2012.

External links
 

1932 films
1932 Western (genre) films
1930s English-language films
American Western (genre) films
Films directed by Robert N. Bradbury
American black-and-white films
Monogram Pictures films
1930s American films